The Sasaram back-to-back HVDC station  is a back-to-back HVDC connection between the eastern and northern regions in India, located close to the city of Sasaram, in Bihar state in northeastern India.  The station  is owned by Power Grid Corporation of India.

The converter station consists one pole with a nominal power transmission rating of 500 MW.   The converter station was built by Alstom between 1999 and 2002 and has nominal DC voltage and current ratings of 205 kV, 2475 A.  The design is very similar to that of the Chandrapur and Vizag 1 converter stations also built for Power Grid.

In 2006, the Eastern and Northern regions were made part of the combined NEW grid. As a result, the converter station is no longer required for its original purpose of asynchronously linking the Eastern and Northern grids, although it can still be used as an embedded power flow device to help control power flow within the AC system.   The converter station could potentially be shifted to elsewhere to export/import power from other countries.

Sites

See also
 PGCIL

References

External links 

 Power Grid Corporation of India
  Alstom Grid Website

Electric power transmission infrastructure in India
Converter stations
Energy in Bihar